Dhātu may refer to:
 Dhātu (Ayurveda) -- Sanskrit term for the seven fundamental elements of the body.
 Skandha#Eighteen Dhātus and Four Paramatthas -- a Sanskrit technical term meaning realm or substrate in Buddhism
 A term used to denote the classical elements in Indian thought.
 A Theravada Buddhist term for a stupa, a mound-like structure containing Buddhist relics.